Husain Jasim Al-Qaidoom (born 21 November 1986) is a Bahraini handball player for Bahrain SC and the Bahraini national team.

He participated at the 2017 World Men's Handball Championship.

References

1986 births
Living people
Bahraini male handball players
Handball players at the 2006 Asian Games
Asian Games competitors for Bahrain
21st-century Bahraini people